The Cârțișoara is a left tributary of the river Olt in Romania. Its source is near Bâlea Lake in the Făgăraș Mountains. It discharges into the Olt in Cârța.

References

Rivers of Romania
Rivers of Sibiu County